Wild Eyes may refer to:

Music
"Wild Eyes" (Nana Mizuki song), 2005 single by Japanese voice actress and singer Nana Mizuki
"Wild Eyes" (Broiler song), 2014 song by Norwegian DJ duo Broiler featuring Ravvel
"Wild Eyes", song by The Stampeders from their 1971 album Carryin' On
"Wild Eyes", song by Parkway Drive from their 2012 album Atlas
"Wild Eyes", song by South Korean boy band Shinhwa from their 2001 album Hey, Come On!
""Wild Eyes (Angel)", song by Jefferson Starship from their 1981 album Modern Times

Others
Wild Eyes (sailing vessel), sailing vessel of the American sailor Abby Sunderland attempted in 2010 to become the youngest person to sail solo around the world

See also
Metal Max: Wild Eyes, a cancelled role-playing video game of the Metal Max series